Joseph Harry Hampton (21 April 1885 – 15 March 1963) was an English footballer who was born in Wellington, Shropshire. To this day Hampton remains Aston Villa's all-time leading goalscorer in the League.

Playing career

Youth
According to a friend speaking to the Wellington Journal and Shrewsbury News after his death, Hampton began his playing career with Lilleshall Iron Works team then joined Wellington Town, before transferring to Aston Villa on a professional contract for £120 in April 1904.

Aston Villa
Better known as "Happy" Harry Hampton or as "The Wellington Whirlwind," he played as a centre forward for Aston Villa from 1904 to 1920. He scored both goals against Newcastle United in the 1905 FA Cup Final. Hampton was a prolific goalscorer and once scored five goals when Aston Villa beat Sheffield Wednesday 10–0 in a First Division match in 1912. He was joint top goalscorer in the First Division in the 1911–12 season. Between 1913 and 1914 Hampton was capped by England four times, scoring two goals in games against Wales and Scotland.

First World War
Hampton served on the Somme during the First World War and suffered from the effects of mustard gas poisoning. Hampton was never the same player after the War and after scoring 242 goals in 376 games for Aston Villa, he moved to Birmingham. Hampton guested for Stoke in 1918–19, scoring three goals in eight appearances. He also guested for Fulham.

Birmingham
At Birmingham, Hampton became the Second Division club's star player, his 16 goals made him their top scorer for the 1920–21 season and helped the club win the Second Division title. He ultimately scored 31 goals out of 59 appearances in the club before transferring to Newport County in Wales.

Later
Later, playing for Newport County, he scored two goals in 15 appearances. He returned to Wellington Town, only to appear for one season.

Following his retirement from playing, Hampton was a coach at Preston North End and former club, Birmingham. He later ran a catering business in Rhyl, where he died in 1963 at the age of 77.

Career statistics
Source:

Honours

Aston Villa
 1904–05 FA Cup
 1909–10 Football League First Division
 1912–13 FA Cup

Birmingham
 1920–21 Football League Second Division

References
General
Entry on Aston Villa Player Database

Specific

1885 births
1963 deaths
People from Wellington, Shropshire
English footballers
England international footballers
English Football League players
First Division/Premier League top scorers
Association football forwards
Telford United F.C. players
Aston Villa F.C. players
Birmingham City F.C. players
Newport County A.F.C. players
Blackpool F.C. wartime guest players
Stoke City F.C. wartime guest players
English Football League representative players
East Surrey Regiment soldiers
Royal Army Medical Corps soldiers
British Army personnel of World War I
Royal Fusiliers soldiers
Preston North End F.C. non-playing staff
Birmingham City F.C. non-playing staff
FA Cup Final players
Military personnel from Shropshire